Jeffrey Davis (born 31 March 1954) is a British gymnast. He competed in seven events at the 1976 Summer Olympics.

References

1954 births
Living people
British male artistic gymnasts
Olympic gymnasts of Great Britain
Gymnasts at the 1976 Summer Olympics
Place of birth missing (living people)
Commonwealth Games medallists in gymnastics
Commonwealth Games silver medallists for England
Gymnasts at the 1978 Commonwealth Games
Medallists at the 1978 Commonwealth Games